Chloé Simone Valdary is an American writer and entrepreneur whose company, Theory of Enchantment, teaches social and emotional learning in schools, as well as diversity and inclusion in companies and government agencies.

Early life and education
Valdary grew up in New Orleans, in a family that belonged to the Seventh-Day Sabbatarian Christian Intercontinental Church of God. In 2015, Valdary graduated magna cum laude from the University of New Orleans, earning a BA in international studies.

Career
Valdary founded a pro-Israel student group, Allies of Israel, while a student at the University of New Orleans. Over the years, she has participated in debates where she represented the Zionist perspective. She is from a Zionist school of thought akin to Rudy Rochman. 

Before 2015, she served as a Robert L. Bartley Fellow and Tikvah fellow under journalist and political commentator Bret Stephens at The Wall Street Journal. In addition to  The Wall Street Journal, Valdary has written articles for The New York Times and The Atlantic magazine.

Valdary has also criticized critical race theory, asserting that it fails to truly capture human complexity and oversimplifies reality.

References

Year of birth missing (living people)
Living people
Activists from New Orleans
University of New Orleans alumni
African-American activists
American Christian Zionists
African-American writers
African-American women writers
21st-century American women
American anti-racism activists
21st-century African-American women